Priscilla Nelson was the Provost and Senior Vice President for Academic Affairs of New Jersey Institute of Technology (NJIT) in Newark, New Jersey from May 2005 to November 2008. She is currently the Department Head and Professor, Department of Mining Engineering, Colorado School of Mines.

Education
Nelson holds a bachelor's degree in Geological Science from the University of Rochester. She earned her master's degrees in Geology from Indiana University and in Structural Engineering from the University of Oklahoma. She also has a PhD in Geotechnical Engineering from Cornell University (1983).

Honors and awards
 Fellow of the American Association for the Advancement of Science
 Honorary Member of the American Society of Civil Engineers (ASCE)
 Eminent Engineer of Tau Beta Pi
 First president of the American Rock Mechanics Association
 Former president of the Geo-Institute of ASCE
 Former Chair of the Division of Engineering in AAAS.

References

External links
'NJIT : - May 2005 -- Priscilla Nelson named Provost of New Jersey Institute of Technology'
'NJIT : Expert Database -- For the Media - Priscilla Nelson'

Cornell University alumni
Indiana University alumni
Living people
New Jersey Institute of Technology
University of Oklahoma alumni
University of Rochester alumni
University of Texas at Austin faculty
Year of birth missing (living people)